This is a complete list of fellows of the Royal Society elected in its third year, 1662.

Fellows 

Isaac Barrow (1630–1677)
Sir John Brookes (1636–1691)
Ralph Cudworth (1617–1688)
John Graunt (1620–1674)
George Lane (1621–1683)
William Schroter (1640–1699)
Robert Spencer (1640–1702)
Henry de Vic ( 1599–1671)

References

1662
1662 in science
1662 in England